Ambush is a 1950 American Western film directed by Sam Wood and starring Robert Taylor, John Hodiak and Arlene Dahl. The plot is based on the serial story Ambush by Luke Short in The Saturday Evening Post (25 December 1948 – 12 February 1949). It is also the first MGM film in the 1950s'.

The movie was filmed on location at the Corriganville Ranch in Simi Valley, California, home of hundreds of western movies and television shows through the decades as well as such outdoor action films as The Adventures of Robin Hood (1938) and Jungle Jim (1948). Additional location work for the film took place in and around Gallup, New Mexico.

Plot summary
In 1878, Ward Kinsman (Robert Taylor), a prospector and Indian scout, has been persuaded by the US Cavalry to find Mary Carlyle, the daughter of a general, who has been taken by Apaches.

Setting out on the trail with a few cavalrymen and Ann Duverall (Arlene Dahl), Mary’s sister, they come across an Apache encampment. Ward learns from an Apache woman that Mary has been taken by an Apache called Diablito. Returning to the cavalry fort with Tana, a captive Apache, preparations are made for a full-scale expedition to find Diablito.

Captain Lorrison (John Hodiak) proposes to Ann. Ann tells Ward that she has accepted his marriage proposal, but Ward persuades her that she is in love with him.

The expedition sets off. Tana tries a double-cross and Ward kills him in self-defence. Eventually the trackers come across Diablito’s camp and stampede the horses. A gun battle ensues. A cavalry re-enforcement column arrives and routs the band of Indians. Ward rescues Mary. Lorrison sets off in pursuit of the escaping Apache, but he is ambushed and killed. Mary and Ann are re-united back at the fort.

Cast
 Robert Taylor as Ward Kinsman
 Arlene Dahl as Ann Duverall
 John Hodiak as Capt. Ben Lorrison
 Don Taylor as Lt. Linus Delaney
 Jean Hagen as Martha Conovan
 Bruce Cowling as Tom Conovan
 Leon Ames as Maj. Breverly
 John McIntire as Frank Holly
 Pat Moriarity as Sgt. Mack
 Charles Stevens as Diablito
 Chief Thundercloud as Tana
 Ray Teal as Capt. Wolverson
 Robin Short as Lt. Storrow
 Richard Bailey as Lt. Tremaine

Reception
According to MGM records the film earned $2,108,000 in the US and Canada and $1,107,000 overseas, resulting in a $401,000 profit.

References

External links

 
 
 
 

1950 films
1950 Western (genre) films
American Western (genre) films
American black-and-white films
Films directed by Sam Wood
Metro-Goldwyn-Mayer films
Films set in 1878
Western (genre) cavalry films
1950s English-language films
1950s American films